Sir Philip Wilbraham Baker Wilbraham, 6th Baronet,  (17 September 1875 – 11 October 1957) was a British ecclesiastical lawyer and administrator.

Biography 
Wilbraham was born at Rode Hall, Cheshire, the son of Sir George Barrington Baker Wilbraham, 5th Baronet, and of Katharine Frances Wilbraham, daughter of General Sir Richard Wilbraham. He was also a descendant of Sir George Baker, 1st Baronet. Wilbraham was educated at Harrow School and Balliol College, Oxford. He was elected a fellow of All Souls College, Oxford in 1899. He married Joyce Christabel Kennaway, daughter of Sir John Kennaway, 3rd Baronet, in 1901.

Wilbraham joined the chambers of Charles Sargant and was called to the bar by Lincoln's Inn in 1901. Specialising in ecclesiastical law, he was appointed Chancellor of the diocese of Chester in 1913, Chancellor and Vicar-General of York in 1915, Chancellor of the diocese of Truro in 1923, of Chelmsford in 1928, and of Durham in 1929. He held these offices until 1934 he was appointed Dean of the Arches, Master of the Faculties, and Vicar-General of the province of Canterbury, and auditor of the Chancery Court of York, retiring in 1955.

Wilbraham was an original member and served as the first secretary of the Church Assembly from 1920 to 1939, when he was appointed First Church Estates Commissioner. He retired from the post and was appointed a KBE in 1954.

References

1957 deaths
Baronets in the Baronetage of Great Britain
People educated at Harrow School
Alumni of Balliol College, Oxford
Fellows of All Souls College, Oxford
Members of Lincoln's Inn
Church Estates Commissioners
Knights Commander of the Order of the British Empire
Lawyers awarded knighthoods